The Continental American Workers Association (ACAT) was an anarcho-syndicalist trade union confederation that functioned as the Latin American branch of the International Workers' Association (IWA-AIT).

In May 1929 the Argentine Regional Workers' Federation (FORA) convened a congress of all South American countries, which met in Buenos Aires. In this congress, apart from the Argentina section, the following were represented: Paraguay, by the Centro Obrero del Paraguay; Bolivia, by the Local Federation of la Paz, Antorcha y la Luz y la Libertad; Mexico, by the General Confederation of Workers; Guatemala, by the Committee for Trade Union Action; Uruguay, by the Uruguayan Regional Federation. Delegates from seven Brazilian States were present. Costa Rica was represented by the organization Hacia la Libertad. Delegates from the Industrial Workers of the World arrived from Chile. The AIT also sent one of its secretaries, Augustin Souchy.

However, the organization failed to make a significant impact as anarcho-syndicalism lost terrain in the Latin American labour movement during the 1930s, a trend that could not be reversed even after the arrival of exiled Spanish FAI members after their defeat in the Spanish Civil War. The association dissolved in 1936.

today IWA sections in latin america try to re-establish it (https://www.acat-ait.org)

References

Bibliography

International Workers' Association
Inter-American trade union federations
Defunct transnational trade unions
Trade unions established in the 1920s
Organizations disestablished in 1936
1920s establishments in Argentina
1936 disestablishments